Fuoco nero is a black-and-white 1951 Italian melodrama film. It was released as Black Fire in the U.S.

Cast
Otello Toso
Franca Marzi
Delia Scala
Saro Urzì
Renato Valente
Charles Rutherford
Giovanna Scotto
Attilio Dottesio (credited as Aldo Dottesio)
Checco Durante
Elio Steiner
Renato Malavasi
Marilyn Buferd

External links
 

1951 films
1950s Italian-language films
Italian drama films
1951 drama films
Melodrama films
Italian black-and-white films
1950s Italian films